This is a list of the largest daily changes in the Russell 2000 Index since 1987.

Largest percentage changes

Largest point changes

Largest intraday point swings

Largest daily percentage changes per year 

 Year has not yet ended.

See also 
Russell 2000 Index
List of largest daily changes in the S&P 500 Index
List of largest daily changes in the Nasdaq Composite
List of largest daily changes in the Dow Jones Industrial Average

References

External links 
 https://finance.yahoo.com/quote/%5ERUT/history?p=%5ERUT

Economy-related lists of superlatives
2000_index_changes